Yershov, Ershov (masculine) or Yershova, Ershova (feminine) is a popular Russian surname derived from the word for a ruffe (ёрш) (a type of fish), which may refer to:

People
 Andrey Ershov (1931–1988), Soviet computer scientist
 Galina Yershova (born 1955), Russian academic historian, epigrapher, and Mayanist scholar
 Mikhail Aleksandrovich Yershov (born 1986), Russian footballer
 Nikolay Grigoryevich Yershov (1837–1896), Russian entomologist
 Pyotr Yershov (disambiguation), several people
 Vasily Yershov (1672 – after 1729), governor and vice governor of Moscow
 Victor Ershov (born 1958), Russian wheelchair curler
 Yury Yershov (born 1940),  Russian mathematician
 Ivan Yershov (1867–1943), Russian opera singer
 Giennadij Jerszow (born 1967), Polish and Ukrainian sculptor
Places
 Yershov Urban Settlement, a municipal formation which the town of Yershov and four rural localities in Yershovsky District of Saratov Oblast are incorporated as
 Yershov (inhabited locality) (or Yershova), several inhabited localities in Russia

Russian-language surnames